Lipnitsky (Russian:Липницкий, Hebrew: ליפניק) is a surname in male form (the female form is Lipnitskaya or Lipnitskaia [Липницкая]).  Notable people with the surname include: 

Isaac Lipnitsky 
Aleksandr Lipnitsky

Yulia Lipnitskaya

References  

Surnames
Russian-language surnames
Jewish surnames